The Santa Elena River is a river of Bolivia in the Chuquisaca Department, Nor Cinti Province, partly on the border of Inka Wasi Municipality and San Lucas Municipality. It is a right affluent of the upper Pillku Mayu.

See also

 List of rivers of Bolivia
 Inka Wasi River
 Puka Pampa River

References

Rand McNally, The New International Atlas, 1993.

Rivers of Chuquisaca Department